Hugh Ford (February 5, 1868 – 1952) was an American film director and screenwriter. He directed or co-directed 31 films between 1913 and 1921. He also wrote for 19 films between 1913 and 1920.

Filmography

Director
 The Prisoner of Zenda (1913) co-director
 Such a Little Queen (1914) co-director
 The Crucible (1914) co-director
 The Morals of Marcus (1915)
 Niobe (1915)
 When We Were Twenty-One (1915)
 Sold (1915)
 Poor Schmaltz (1915)
 The White Pearl (1915)
 Zaza (1915)
 Bella Donna (1915)
 The Prince and the Pauper (1915) co-director
 Lydia Gilmore (1915) co-director
 The Eternal City (1915) co-director
 The Woman in the Case (1916)
 Sleeping Fires (1917)
 The Slave Market  (1917)
 Seven Keys to Baldpate  (1917)
 Sapho  (1917)
 Mrs. Dane's Defense (1918)
 The Danger Mark  (1918)
 Mrs. Wiggs of the Cabbage Patch (1919)
 The Woman Thou Gavest Me (1919)
 Secret Service (1919)
 In Mizzoura (1919)
 Civilian Clothes (1920)
 His House in Order (1920)
 Lady Rose's Daughter (1920)
 The Call of Youth (1921)
 The Great Day (1921)
 The Price of Possession (1921)

Screenwriter
 The Prisoner of Zenda (1913) co-directed with Edwin S. Porter after the novel by Anthony Hope
 Such a Little Queen (1914) co-directed with Edwin S. Porter, from a play by Channing Pollock
 The Crucible (1914) co-directed with Edwin S. Porter
 Jim the Penman (1915) directed by Edwin S. Porter
 Still Waters directed by (1915) J. Searle Dawley
 The Prince and the Pauper (1915) co-directed with Edwin S. Porter
 The Old Homestead (1915) directed by James Kirkwood
 Lydia Gilmore (1915) co-directed with Edwin S. Porter
 Mice and Men (1916) directed by J. Searle Dawley
 Diplomacy (1916) directed by Sidney Olcott
 The Innocent Lie (1916) directed by Sidney Olcott
 Molly Make-Believe (1916) directed by J. Searle Dawley
 The Moment Before (1916) directed by Robert G. Vignola
 The Red Widow (1916) directed by James Durkin
 Saints and Sinners (1916) directed by James Kirkwood
 Silks and Satins (1916) directed by J. Searle Dawley
 Little Lady Eileen (1916) directed by J. Searle Dawley
 Sapho (1916) also directed
 Sleeping Fires (1917) also directed
 His House in Order (1920) also directed

References

External links

1868 births
1952 deaths
American theatre directors
American film directors
American male screenwriters
20th-century American male writers
20th-century American screenwriters